Trifle is a  trimaran sailboat designed by Derek Kelsall and produced in 1966 as a further development of his first trimaran Toria. Featuring a full roach main and small jib, the vessel took part in the 1967 Crystal Trophy race in the English Channel. At the time, it was considered one of the fastest ocean-going multihulls in the world.

See also
List of multihulls
Mirrorcat (catamaran)
Toria
Derek Kelsall

References

Trimarans
1960s sailing yachts